Kummariguda may refer to any of the following villages in Telangana state, India: 

Kummariguda, Kothur, a village in Kothar mandal, Ranga Reddy district
Kummariguda, Shabad, a village in Shabad mandal, Ranga Reddy district